The following is a list of notable alumni and faculty of the City College of New York.

Nobel laureates

 Julius Axelrod 1933 – Nobel laureate in Medicine, 1970
 Kenneth Arrow 1940 – Nobel laureate in Economics, 1972
 Robert J. Aumann 1950 – Nobel laureate in Economics, 2005
 Herbert Hauptman 1937 – Nobel laureate in Chemistry, 1965
 Robert Hofstadter 1935 – Nobel laureate in Physics, 1961
 Jerome Karle 1937 – Nobel laureate in Chemistry, 1985
 Henry Kissinger 1923 (did not graduate) – winner of Nobel Peace Prize, 1973
 Arthur Kornberg 1937 – Nobel laureate in Medicine, 1959
 Leon M. Lederman 1943 – Nobel laureate in Physics, 1988
 Arno Penzias 1954 – Nobel laureate in Physics, 1978
 Julian Schwinger (transferred to Columbia University) – Nobel laureate in Physics, 1965
 John O'Keefe – Nobel laureate in Medicine, 2014

Graduates of Business School (which became Baruch College in 1968)

 William F. Aldinger III 1969 – chairman and CEO, HSBC North America Holdings
 Abraham Beame 1928 – Mayor of New York City
 Akis Cleanthous – former Minister of Education and Culture, Cyprus
 Monte Conner 1986 – senior vice president of Roadrunner Records, A&R Department
 Michael Grimm – member of United States House of Representatives for New York's 13th congressional district
 Sidney Harman  1939 – founder and executive chairman of Harman Kardon; owner of Newsweek
 Ralph Lauren (dropped out) – fashion designer, Polo
 Carlos D. Ramirez – publisher of El Diario La Prensa
 Carl Spielvogel BBA 1957 – former U.S. Ambassador to Slovakia
 Craig A. Stanley – member of New Jersey General Assembly, 1996-2008
 George Weissman BBA 1939 – former CEO, Philip Morris International
 Larry Zicklin 1957 – former chairman, Neuberger Berman

Politics, history, government, sociology, philosophy, and religion

 Herman Badillo 1951 – Congressman and chairman of CUNY's board of trustees
 Bernard M. Baruch 1889 – Wall Street financier and adviser to American Presidents; author of the Baruch Plan
 Max Beauvoir 1958 – Haitian Vodou priest and Supreme Chief 
 Daniel Bell 1939 – sociologist, professor at Harvard University
 Abraham D. Beame 1928 – mayor of New York City, 1974 to 1977
 Stephen Bronner – political theorist, Marxist, professor at Rutgers University
 Frank Caplan – educator, founder of children's educational toy company Creative Playthings
 Upendra J. Chivukula – first Asian American elected to the New Jersey General Assembly
 Henry Cohen 1943 – director, Föhrenwald DP Camp; Founding Dean of the Milano School for Management and Urban Policy at The New School
 Morris Raphael Cohen – graduate of CCNY and professor at CCNY; philosopher, lawyer, and legal scholar; namesake of the Cohen Library at CCNY
 Marty Dolin – former Manitoba NDP MLA for Kildonan
 Philip Elman – Justice Department attorney and Federal Trade Commission member, wrote government's brief in Brown v. Board of Education
 Benjamin B. Ferencz – international jurist and criminal justice pioneer; co-winner of the 2009 Erasmus Prize
 Louis Finkelstein – Conservative Jewish theologian
 Abraham Foxman – national director of the Anti-Defamation League
 Felix Frankfurter 1902 – justice of the U.S. Supreme Court
 George Friedman – founder of Stratfor, author, professor of political science, security and defense analyst
 Nathan Glazer – sociologist, professor at Harvard University; author of Beyond the Melting Pot with Daniel Patrick Moynihan
 Steven Goldberg – president of the sociology department of CCNY
 Paul Goodman – writer, social critic, public intellectual; author of The Empire City, Growing Up Absurd, and Communitas
 Edmund W. Gordon – founding director of the Institute for Research on African Diaspora in the Americas and Caribbean (IRADAC) at CCNY
 Stanley Graze – economist and former lecturer at CCNY; worked in the United Nations, State Department, US Army and the Brookings Institution; MA from Columbia University
 Carl G. Hempel, philosopher of science and professor of philosophy at CCNY
 Sidney Hook 1923 – writer and philosopher
 Benjamin Kaplan 1929 – helped write the indictments of Nazi war criminals who were tried at Nuremberg; served as Nuremberg prosecutor; distinguished Harvard law professor
 Henry Kissinger – Secretary of State under Richard Nixon and Gerald Ford
 Ed Koch 1945 – mayor of New York City, 1978 to 1989
 Irving Kristol 1940 – neoconservative intellectual, professor at New York University
 David Landes 1942 – historian, professor at Harvard University
 Melvin J. Lasky 1938 – anti-communist, editor of Encounter 1958 to 1991
 Milton Leitenberg – American arms control expert
 Felix A. Levy 1904 – rabbi
 Albert L. Lewis – conservative rabbi, president of international Rabbinical Assembly
 Samuel A. Lewis – politician and philanthropist in the late 19th century; a trustee of the college
 Guillermo Linares 1975 – the first Dominican-American New York City Council Member
 Seymour Martin Lipset – political sociology, trade unions
 Deborah Lipstadt 1969 – historian; combatted Holocaust denial
 Rachel Lloyd – applied urban anthropology graduate; founder of Girls Educational and Mentoring Services in New York
Joseph Lookstein – rabbi and president of Bar-Ilan University
 Jay Lovestone 1918 – radical political leader and trade union functionary
 Richard Lowitt (B.A.) – historian, Guggenheim Fellow.
 Sidney Morgenbesser – philosopher, John Dewey Professor of Philosophy, Columbia University, known to have witheringly applied Jewish humor to issues in metaphysics and epistemology
 Henry Morgenthau, Sr. – financier and diplomat; as ambassador to Ottoman Empire attempted to warn the world about the Armenian genocide
 Daniel Patrick Moynihan – spent a year at CCNY before he was drafted; author of Beyond the Melting Pot with Nathan Glazer; ambassador to the U.N.; senator representing New York
 Massimo Pigliucci – scientist and philosopher
 Colin L. Powell 1961– U.S. Secretary of State, Chairman of the Joint Chiefs of Staff, U.S. Army General, National Security Advisor
 Donald A. Ritchie 1967 – historian, currently historian of the United States Senate
 Alexander Rosenberg – Lakatos Award-winning philosopher at Duke University
 Julius Rosenberg – executed for espionage during the Cold War
 Bertrand Russell – invited by the philosophy department in 1940 to become a professor but his appointment was blocked by a suit and timidity on the part of the Board of Higher Education; see the Bertrand Russell Case
 Bayard Rustin - (did not graduate) African American leader in social movements for civil rights, socialism, nonviolence, and gay rights (an (adviser to Martin Luther King, Jr. and main organizer of the March on Washington in 1963).
Bernice Sandler (M.A. 1950), the 'Godmother of Title IX'
 Oscar Schachter 1936 – law professor and United Nations aide
 George D. Schwab 1954 – political scientist, editor and academic, president of the National Committee on American Foreign Policy
 Henry Schwarzschild – founder of NCADP, LCDC, and head of ACLU's Capital Punishment project in America
 Allen G. Schwartz – U.S. federal judge
 Morrie Schwartz – sociologist, author, and subject of Tuesdays with Morrie
 Philip Selznick 1938 - sociologist, organizational theorist
 Assata Shakur – civil rights activist; involved in May 1973 shootout on the New Jersey Turnpike in which a state trooper was killed
 Moses J. Stroock 1886 – lawyer
 Myron Sulzberger – American lawyer, politician, and judge
 Stanley S. Surrey 1929 – tax law scholar, Assistant Secretary of the Treasury for Tax Policy from 1961 to 1969
 Samuel Turk – rabbi, religious leader, columnist
 Friedrich Ulfers 1959 – Deconstructionist writer, Dean of Media and Communications at European Graduate School, and NYU professor
 Robert F. Wagner, Sr. – U.S. Senator from New York, 1927 to 1949; introduced the National Labor Relations Act
 Michele Wallace 1975 – major figure in African-American studies, feminist studies and cultural studies
 General Alexander S. Webb – second president of the college; winner of the Congressional Medal of Honor for heroism at the Battle of Gettysburg
 Melvyn Weiss (1935–2018, class of 1956), attorney who co-founded the plaintiff class action law firm Milberg Weiss.
 Stephen Samuel Wise 1891 – Reform rabbi, early Zionist and social justice activist
 Bertram D. Wolfe 1916 – political activist and historian

Psychology
 Solomon Asch 1928 – psychologist, known for the Asch conformity experiments
 Morton Bard – psychologist, trailblazer in crisis intervention and author of The Crime Victim's Book
 Isidor Chein 1932 – minority group identification, co-wrote amicus curiae brief in Brown v. Board of Education
 Kenneth Clark – CCNY professor who studied attitudes toward race and testified at Brown v. Board of Education
 Jacob Cohen – psychologist and statistician, developed the coefficient kappa to assess the reliability of ratings of discrete categories of behavior (e.g., diagnoses of mental disorder); expert on factor analysis and regression analysis
 Morton Deutsch – social psychology, conflict resolution
 Leonard Eron – expert on the development of aggression
 Leon Festinger 1939 – social psychologist; pioneered experimental social psychology, the theory of cognitive dissonance
 Robert Glaser – educational psychology
 Henry Gleitman – cognitive psychology, psycholinguistics
 Arno Gruen – psychologist and psychoanalyst
 Samuel Guze - psychiatrist; pioneered the emergence of psychiatry's ability to validly diagnose disorders
 Richard Herrnstein – quantitative analysis of behavior; co-author of The Bell Curve; Harvard professor
 Frederick Irving Herzberg – two-factor theory of job satisfaction
 Richard Lazarus – emotion, stress, and coping
 Abraham Maslow – psychologist, known of Maslow's hierarchy of needs
 Barry Mehler - psychologist, MA from CCNY, 1972
 Walter Mischel – social and personality psychology
 Gardner Murphy – professor of psychology at City College
 Charles Nemeroff – chair of psychiatry at the University of Miami Miller School of Medicine
 Vera S. Paster –  clinical psychologist known for her contributions to ethnic minority issues and mental health
 Margaret Rosario –  clinical psychologist known for her research on human sexuality 
 Irvin Rock 1947; MA 1948 – professor of psychology at Berkeley. Leading researcher on perception
 Hans Strupp (did not graduate) – expert in psychotherapy research

The arts

 Woody Allen (briefly attended)
 Maurice Ashley 1993 – first African American International Chess Grandmaster
 Jeff Barry – singer/songwriter; wrote with his wife Ellie Greenwich many hit songs, including "Be My Baby" and "Baby, I Love You"
 Deborah Berke – architect
Chakaia Booker – sculptor
 Seymour Boardman – New York abstract expressionist
 Joshua Brand – Emmy Award-winning writer, director, and producer
 Eddie Carmel, born Oded Ha-Carmeili (1936–1972) – Israeli-born entertainer with gigantism and acromegaly, popularly known as "The Jewish Giant"
 Paddy Chayefsky 1943 – playwright and screenwriter; wrote Marty, The Hospital, Network, and Altered States
 Shirley Clarke – independent filmmaker
 Madeleine Cosman – author of medieval cookbook
 Julie Dash – filmmaker best known for Daughters of the Dust
 Edward Eliscu – songwriter; screenwriter; actor; wrote lyrics for "Carioca" (nominated for Best Song Oscar in 1935), inducted into the Songwriters Hall of Fame
 Victor Ganz – collector of contemporary art in the 20th century
 Davidson Garrett – poet; actor; New York City yellow taxi cab driver; known for his book King Lear of the Taxi: Musings of a New York City Actor/Taxi Driver
 Ira Gershwin 1918 – lyricist; collaborator with his brother George Gershwin, and with Jerome Kern, Kurt Weill, and Harold Arlen
 William Gibson 1938 – playwright, The Miracle Worker
 Marv Goldberg 1964 – music historian in the field of rhythm & blues
 Hazelle Goodman 1986 – stage, screen and TV actress
 Bill Graham – music promoter
 Allen J. Grubman – entertainment lawyer
 Arthur Guiterman – humorous poet
 Luis Guzmán – actor
 E.Y. "Yip" Harburg 1918 – lyricist, "Brother Can You Spare a Dime?," The Wizard of Oz, Finian's Rainbow
 Caroline Hirsch – founder of the comedy club Caroline's
 Judd Hirsch 1960 – actor
 Sam Jaffe 1912 – actor, teacher, musician, and engineer
 Sondra James - actress
 Dayal Kaur Khalsa 1963 (as Marcia Schonfeld) – author of children's books
 Arthur Knight 1940 – movie critic, historian, teacher and TV host
 Stanley Kubrick 1946 – film director
 Mordecai Lawner – actor
 Ernest Lehman BS 1937 – screenwriter
 David Maurice Levett – composer and music teacher
 Leonard Liebling 1897  – composer, music critic, and long time editor-in-chief of the Musical Courier
 Hal Linden – actor, musician
 Frank Loesser (did not graduate) – songwriter; Tin Pan Alley, stage and films; wrote music and lyrics of "Praise the Lord and Pass the Ammunition" and the music of Guys and Dolls, etc.
 Donald Madden – stage, television, and screen actor
 Roma Maffia – actress
 David Margulies – actor
 Ernest Martin – theatre director and manager
 Jackie Mason – comedian and actor
 Jerry Masucci – founder of Fania Records
 Radley Metzger – filmmaker and film distributor
 Andy Mineo – rapper, singer, producer, director, actor and minister
 Sterling Morrison 1970 – musician, co-founder of The Velvet Underground
 Zero Mostel 1935 – actor
 Stanley Nelson 1976 – documentary filmmaker
 John Patitucci, jazz bassist, City College
 Abraham Polonsky 1932 – screenwriter, director of Force of Evil
 George Ranalli 1946 – architect and dean, Spitzer School of Architecture of The City College of New York
 Adrienne Rich – feminist poet and essayist; taught at CCNY from 1968 to 1979
 Faith Ringgold – artist known for her painted story quilts
 Edward G. Robinson 1914 – actor
 Judith Rossner – novelist; author of Looking for Mr. Goodbar and August; attended 1952–1955.
 Mickey Rourke – actor; never officially attended, but began auditing Sandra Seacat's acting class in 1975, making what is generally referred to as his stage debut at CCNY in May of that year
 Chris Rush 1968 – stand-up comedian
 Robert Russin – sculptor
 Richard Schiff 1983 – Emmy Award-winning actor; star of The West Wing (played Toby Ziegler; see "Fictional" below)
 Sandra Seacat 1970s – actor, director and acting coach, taught acting at City College
 Ben Shahn – artist
 Dan Shor – actor
 Gabourey Sidibe – actress, majored in psychology
 Russell Simmons (did not graduate) – rap mogul
 Hrvoje Slovenc – photographer
 Erik Sommer – contemporary artist
 Alfred Stieglitz 1884 – photographer
 Ed Summerlin – tenor saxophonist, composer and arranger; directed CCNY's jazz program 1971-1989
 Jean Toomer - novelist; associated with the Harlem renaissance; did not graduate
 Roy Turk – songwriter; member of the Songwriters' Hall of Fame; wrote lyrics of standards including  "Mean To Me," "I'll Get By," "Walkin' My Baby Back Home," and others
 Vagabon – multi-instrumentalist, singer-songwriter and producer; graduated from Grove School of Engineering
 J. Buzz Von Ornsteiner – forensic psychologist; television personality
 Eli Wallach MA 1938 – actor
 Dirk Weiler – singer and actor
 Cornel Wilde 1935 – actor
 Darko Lungulov 1996 – film director
 Sergio George 1961 – producer, musician

Literature and journalism
Keith Sweat 1984 – R&B singer,  and radio show host personality
 Alan Abelson 1942 – columnist, former editor, Barron's
 Marc D. Angel MA – rabbinic leader, published author
 Maurice Ashley 1988 – chess grandmaster, chess promoter, and author
 Toni Cade Bambara
 Helen Boyd 1995 – writer, speaker, and educator on gender and transgender theory
 Lawrence Bush – author and editor of Jewish Currents
 Barbara Christian
 Dan Daniel 1910 – dean of American sportswriters
 Dayal Kaur Khalsa (née Marcia Schonfeld) 1963 - award-winning author of children's books
 Reuben Fine 1932 – chess grandmaster, psychologist, and author
Davidson Garrett 1988 – American poet
Floriana Garo 1987 – Albanian television presenter and model
 Rebecca Newberger Goldstein – novelist, philosopher, MacArthur Fellow
 Vivian Gornick – writer, memoirist, feminist, professor; author of Fierce Attachments (1987)
 Clyde Haberman 1966 – New York Times reporter and columnist
 Safiya Henderson-Holmes MFA – Poet, winner of the 1990 William Carlos Williams Award
 Oscar Hijuelos 1975 – won the 1990 Pulitzer Prize for novel The Mambo Kings Play Songs of Love
 Hy Hollinger – entertainment trade journalist, reporter and editor for Variety, international editor of The Hollywood Reporter (1992–2008)
 Irving Howe 1940 – author of World of Our Fathers, literary critic, coined the phrase "New York Jewish Intellectual"
 John Johnson BA 1961, MA 1963 – journalist and television news correspondent/anchor
 June Jordan
 Bernard Kalb 1951 – journalist and television news correspondent
 Marvin Kalb 1951 – journalist and television news correspondent
 Kwame Karikari – Ghanaian journalist and academic 
 David Karp 1948 – novelist and television writer
 Alfred Kazin – author of A Walker in the City, literary critic
 Marvin Kitman 1953 – television critic, humorist, and author
 Jack Kroll 1937 – culture editor, Newsweek
 Joseph P. Lash 1931 – Pulitzer Prize for Biography winner, author of Eleanor and Franklin
 Harvey Leonard (Moskowitz) 1970 – meteorologist, broadcast journalist, and TV personality
 Paul Levinson – author of The Plot to Save Socrates and The Silk Code (winner, Locus Award, 1999)
 Oscar Lewis 1936 – anthropologist, author, and professor
 Douglas Light 2003 – novelist, screenwriter, short story writer (O. Henry Prize winner 2003, Grace Paley Prize 2010)
 Audre Lorde
 Bernard Malamud BA 1936 – author (won the 1967 Pulitzer Prize and a National Book Award); author of The Assistant
 Henry Miller Attended one semester. Author of Tropic of Cancer. 
 Ralph Morse – career photographer for LIFE magazine; youngest war correspondent in World War II; recipient of the 1995 Joseph A. Sprague Memorial Award, the highest honor in photojournalism
 Montrose Jonas Moses 1899 – author
 Walter Mosley 1991 (MA) – best-selling author whose novels about private eye Easy Rawlins have received Edgar and Golden Dagger Awards
 Larry Neal
 Michael Oreskes 1975 – former senior vice president for news at NPR
 Arthur Pine – author, literary agent
 Mario Puzo – best-selling novelist; screenwriter, The Godfather
 Ernesto Quiñonez BA, MA 1996 – national bestselling author of Bodega Dreams
 Robert Rosen BA 1974, MA 1977 – author of the best-selling biography Nowhere Man: The Final Days of John Lennon
 A.M. Rosenthal 1949 – former executive editor of The New York Times
 Henry Roth 1928 – novelist, author of Call It Sleep
 Miriam Roth – Israeli writer and scholar of children's books; kindergarten teacher; educator
 Robert Scheer – journalist
 Daniel Schorr 1939 – journalist, newscaster, and commentator for CBS, CNN, and NPR
 Stephen Shepard 1961 – editor-in-chief, Business Week
 Anatole Shub – editor and journalist specializing in Eastern European matters
 Upton Sinclair BA 1897 – author of The Jungle
 Robert Sobel BSS 1951, MA 1952 – best-selling author of business histories
 Stephen Somerstein BA 1966 – took iconic photographs of the Civil Rights Movement 
 Julius Thompson BA Arts – Teacher and novelist (Andy Michael Pilgrim trilogy)
 Earl Ubell 1948 – print, TV and radio journalist specializing in science and health reporting
 Al Wasserman 1941 – documentary film-maker
 Elsie B. Washington – author (using the pseudonym Rosalind Welles) of the 1980 book Entwined Destinies, considered the first romance novel featuring African American characters written by an African American author
 Gary Weiss 1975 – investigative journalist, author
 Rajzel Żychlińsky – Yiddish-language poet

Science and technology
 Edward I. Altman 1963 – Max L. Heine Professor of Finance at the NYU Stern School of Business and the Academic leader in the study of High-Yield Bond and Distressed Debt Markets and Credit Risk Management
 Solomon A. Berson 1938 – medical scientist at Mt. Sinai Hospital who would probably have won a Nobel with his colleague Rosalyn Yalow had he not died prematurely
 Julius Blank – engineer, member of the "Traitorous Eight" who founded Silicon Valley
 Eli Brookner - BEE 1953 - Radar authority, author, Raytheon Co.
 Burrill Bernard Crohn 1902 – gastroenterologist; known for disease named after him
 Charles DeLisi BA 1963 – scientist, "Father of the Human Genome Project"
 Milton Diamond 1955 –  sexologist and professor of anatomy and reproductive biology
 Jesse Douglas 1916 – mathematician; one of two winners of the first Fields Medal awarded in 1936
 Joel S. Engel 1957 – scientist and electrical engineer instrumental in mobile phone technology
 Adin Falkoff – engineer, computer scientist, co-inventor of the APL language interactive system
 Mitchell Feigenbaum 1964 – mathematical physicist
 Richard Felder 1962 – engineering professor, co-author of Elementary Principles of Chemical Processes
 Jeffrey Scott Flier 1969 – Dean of Harvard Medical School
 Michael Freeman BS 1969 – inventor
Alfred Gessow 1943 – Pioneering helicopter aerodynamicist at NACA/NASA, and professor at University of Maryland
 Wolcott Gibbs – distinguished chemistry professor at the Free Academy
 Seymour Ginsburg 1948 – distinguished computer science professor
Richard D. Gitlin 1964 – engineer, co-invention of DSL Bell Labs
 George Washington Goethals 1887 – civil engineer, supervised the construction and opening of the Panama Canal
 Joseph Goldberger – started in engineering; transferred to Bellevue Hospital Medical School; discovered that B vitamin deficiency was cause of pellagra; paved way for Elvehjem to narrow cause to vitamin B3
 Dan Goldin – 9th and longest-tenured administrator of NASA
 Andrew S. Grove ChE. 1960 – founder and former chairman of Intel Corp; donated $26 million, the largest gift ever received by the college
 Gary Gruber 1962 – physicist, testing expert, educator, author
Alan Hantman – served as 10th Architect of the Capitol
 Herman Hollerith – early computer pioneer, invented Key punch
Girardin Jean-Louis 1997 – professor in the Department of Population Health and Psychiatry at New York University
 Robert E. Kahn – Internet pioneer, co-inventor of the TCP/IP protocol, co-recipient of the Turing Award in 2004
 Michio Kaku – CCNY professor; theoretical physicist and co-founder of string field theory
 Gary A. Klein 1964 – research psychologist, known for pioneering the field of naturalistic decision making
 Leonard Kleinrock 1957 – Internet pioneer
 Edward Kravitz 1954 – neurobiologist
 Solomon Kullback – mathematician; NSA cryptology pioneer
 Arthur J. Levenson – Lieutenant Colonel, United States Army; National Security Agency official; cryptographer; mathematician
 Emanuel Libman – physician
 Valentino Mazzia – forensic anesthesiologist
 Albert Medwin BSEE 1949 – engineer and inventor, developed CMOS integrated circuit technology
 David Michaels 1976 – epidemiologist and Occupational Safety and Health Administration administrator
 Irving Millman 1948 – microbiologist and virologist
 Lewis Mumford – historian of technology; author of The City in History
 Karl J. Niklas – professor of plant biology at Cornell University
 John O'Keefe – neuroscientist, winner of the Nobel Prize in Physiology and Medicine
 Paul Pimsleur – professor, applied linguist, inventor of the Pimsleur language learning system
 Charles Lane Poor – astronomer
 Martin Pope 1939 – physical chemist; 2006 Davy Medal winner; known for pioneering work in electronic process in organic crystals and polymers, particularly discoveries in area of ohmic contacts
 Emil Leon Post – distinguished mathematician and professor of mathematics at CCNY
 George Edward Post – BA in 1854, MA in 1857, and later MD in 1860, professor of surgery at the Syrian Protestant College in Beirut, now the American University of Beirut (AUB).
 Jacob Rabinow – engineer; inventor; held 230 U.S. patents on a variety of mechanical, optical and electrical devices
 Maurice M. Rapport 1940 – biochemist; identified the neurotransmitter serotonin
 Saul Rosen 1941 BS Mathematics – early computer pioneer, mathematician, engineer, and professor
 Jack Ruina 1944 BSEE – former director of ARPA
 Mario Runco Jr. 1974 – astronaut
 Jonas Salk 1934 – inventor of the Salk vaccine (see polio vaccine)
 Harold Scheraga 1941 - pioneering scientist in physical biochemistry
 Philip H. Sechzer 1934 – anesthesiologist; pioneer in pain management; inventor of patient-controlled analgesia (PCA)
 Abraham Sinkov – mathematician; National Security Agency cryptology pioneer
 David L. Spector – biology; professor and director of research, Cold Spring Harbor Laboratory
 David B. Steinman 1906 – engineer; bridge designer; designed the Mackinac Bridge; founded the National Society of Professional Engineers; namesake of the CCNY engineering building
 Leonard Susskind 1962 – physicist, string theory
 Joseph F. Traub 1954 – computer scientist, mathematician
 Edgar Villchur BA, MS 1940 – inventor, educator, writer, founder of Acoustic Research
 Mark Zemansky 1921 – physicist; textbook author; professor of physics at City College of New York from 1925 until he became an Emeritus Professor of Physics in 1967

Business
 Sheldon Adelson – businessman and Republican donor. Attended City College but dropped out before graduating
 Frank Avellino 1958 – accountant involved in the Madoff investment scandal
 Miles Cahn – co-founder of Coach, Inc.
 Millard Drexler – chairman and CEO of J.Crew Group; former CEO of Gap Inc
 Jerald G. Fishman – chief executive officer and president of Analog Devices since November 1996
 Andrew Grove 1960 – 4th employee of Intel, and eventually its president, CEO, and chairman, and Time magazine's Man of the Year in 1997, who donated $26,000,000 to CCNY's Grove School of Engineering in 2005. 
 Joseph Gurwin – philanthropist who dropped out after becoming a partner in a textile firm; "realized I was making more money than my professors"
 Stanley H. Kaplan 1939 – founded Kaplan Educational Services
 Harvey Kaylie 1960 – RF/microwave industry pioneer and founder Mini Circuits Inc.
 Nat Lefkowitz – co-chairman of the William Morris Agency
 Jean Nidetch – founded Weight Watchers
 Jack Rudin 1941 – real estate developer
 Herbert Simon B.B.A. – real estate developer, co-founder of Simon Property Group, owner of the Indiana Pacers NBA basketball team
 Melvin Simon 1949 – real estate developer, co-founder of Simon Property Group
 Bernard Spitzer 1943 – real estate developer
 Linda Kaplan Thaler 1972 – CEO of ad agency in New York; brought us the Aflac Duck
 Robert P. Luciano 1954 - CEO of Scherring-Plough

Sports

 Albert Axelrod (1921–2004), Olympic medalist foil fencer
 Daniel Bukantz (1917–2008), Olympic fencer
 Abram Cohen (1924–2016), Olympic fencer
 Irwin Dambrot – basketball player involved in the CCNY Point Shaving Scandal
Phil Farbman (1924–1996) – basketball player
 Nat Fleischer – founder and editor of Ring magazine. Authority on boxing.
 Heather Foster – Jamaican-born American professional bodybuilder
 Benny Friedman (1905–1982) – University of Michigan and College and NFL Hall of Fame football quarterback, coached the CCNY football team from 1935 to 1941
 Harold Goldsmith 1952 – foil and épée fencer, won the 1952 NCAA foil championship, competed in three Olympiads for the US, won two Pan American Games gold medals and two silver medals
 Sidney Hertzberg (1922–2005) – former NY Knicks basketball player
 Nat Holman (1896–1995) – Hall of Fame basketball player and CCNY coach
 Red Holzman 1942 – All-American guard at CCNY; two-time All-Star NBA guard; basketball coach for the New York Knicks; Hall of Famer
Jane Katz (born 1943) – Olympic swimmer
 Floyd Layne – basketball player involved in the CCNY Point Shaving Scandal; later coached the CCNY men's basketball team
 Bennet Nathaniel "Nate" Lubell (1916–2006) -- Olympic fencer
 Nat Militzok (1923–2009) – basketball player for the New York Knicks
Tubby Raskin (1902–1981) - basketball player and coach
 Saul Rogovin (1922–1995) – Major League Baseball pitcher; 1951 AL ERA leader
 Hank Rosenstein (1920–2010) – basketball player for the New York Knicks
 Barney Sedran (1891–1964) – Member of the Basketball Hall of Fame
 Moe Spahn – basketball player
James Strauch (1921–1998) – Olympic fencer
Fred Thompson (1933–2019) Hall of Fame Track and Field Coach
 Henry Wittenberg (1918–2010)  – Olympic wrestler; won gold medal at 1948 Olympics and silver medal in 1952

Other
 Leon M. Goldstein (died 1999), president of Kingsborough Community College, and acting chancellor of the City University of New York
 Charles F. Hummel (born 1932), curator and deputy director at the Winterthur Museum, Garden and Library
 Raymond Lisle (1910–1994), attorney, officer in the US Foreign Service, and Dean of Brooklyn Law School
 William Gati  (1959), architect, professor at NYIT, principal Architecture Studio, NY,
 Selma Wassermann (born 1929), Canadian-American author, teacher

Fictional
 Lennie Briscoe – character from the TV show Law & Order
 Brian Flanagan – character from the 1988 film Cocktail
 Gordon Gekko – character from the 1987 film Wall Street
 Nancy – character from the 1971 film Bananas
 Sam Posner – character from the 1988 film Crossing Delancey
 Don Draper – character from the TV show Mad Men
 Toby Ziegler – character from the TV show The West Wing

See also
 :Category:City College of New York alumni
 :Category:City College of New York faculty
 List of City College of New York alumni

Notes

City College Of New York